Bindialoum Bainounk is a settlement in Senegal.

External links
PEPAM

Populated places in Senegal